The Papyrus Vindobonensis Graecus 39777 signed as SymP.Vindob.G.39777 – is a fragment of a Greek manuscript of the Psalms of the translation of Symmachus. It was written in papyrus in a scroll form. The papyrus contains fragments of Psalm 69 and Psalm 81 (as the numeration of the Septuagint is Psalms 68 and 80). The P.Vindob.G.39777 is dated to late third century or beginning fourth century AD.

This manuscript probably comes from the Fayum in Egypt.

History 

It was published by the Dr. Carl Wessely in his work Studien zur Palaeographie und Papyruskunde, Vol. XI., Leipzig, 1911, pag. 171.

Description 

The manuscript probably originally contained large portions of the Book of Psalms. The traduction of Symmachs was a part of the Hexapla and Tetrapli, the work contains the translations of the Hebrew to Greek Bible, it was written by Origen. According to Bruce M. Metzger, the Greek translation of Hebrew Bible prepared by Symmachus was realised with a different method that the translation of Aquila, because his intention was not a literal translation, rather an elegant message from the Hebrew to Greek text.

Tegragrammaton 

The papyrus contains the tetragrammaton written in archaic Hebrew characters in Ps 69:13, 30 and 31.

Location 

The Papyrus Vindobonensis Graecus 39777 is kept at the Papyrus Collection of the Austrian National Library at Vienna as (P. Vindob. G. 39777).

References

External links 
 Picture of the Papyrus P.Vindob.G.39777 with the Tetragrammaton selected
 Picture of the Papyrus P.Vindob.G.39777

Psalms
3rd-century biblical manuscripts
4th-century biblical manuscripts